Iris Mittenaere (born 25 January 1993) is a French model, television host, and beauty pageant titleholder who was crowned Miss Universe 2016. She is the second Miss Universe from France after Christiane Martel, who was crowned Miss Universe 1953. Mittenaere had previously been crowned Miss France 2016 and Miss Nord-Pas-de-Calais 2015.

Early life and education
Mittenaere was born on 25 January 1993 in Lille, to Yves Mittenaere, a middle school history and geography teacher, and Laurence Druart, a primary schoolteacher and museum guide. She has a brother, Baptiste, and a sister, Cassandre, and a younger half-sister, Manon. Her parents divorced when she was three years old.

Mittenaere attended school in Steenvoorde, where she lived with her mother. In 2011, she graduated with honors from lycée with a focus on science. After graduating, she moved to Lille, where she attended Lille 2 University of Health and Law, studying dentistry.

Prior to becoming Miss France, Mittenaere was in her fifth year of a dental surgery fellowship and planned on becoming a dental surgeon after graduating.

Pageantry

Miss France 2016
After winning the local title of Miss Flandre 2015 on May 2, 2015 in Bailleul, Mittenaere entered the Miss Nord-Pas-de-Calais 2015 regional pageant in Orchies, which she won on September 26, 2015. Mittenaere initially only entered Miss Flandre after being contacted on Facebook by the contest organizers, due to there being a lack of candidates that applied. Mittenaere represented Nord-Pas-de-Calais at the Miss France 2016 pageant. On 19 December 2015, she was crowned Miss France by outgoing Miss France 2015 and former Miss Nord-Pas-de-Calais 2014 Camille Cerf in Lille. It was a back-to back victory for the region.

As Miss France, Mittenaere promoted oral hygiene and launched an awareness campaign on oral health. She participated in oral hygiene awareness programs at French schools targeting young schoolchildren.

In November 2016, Mittenaere presented the Francophone Group of the Year's Award at the NRJ Music Award in Cannes.

During her reign as Miss France 2016, Mittenaere traveled to China, Italy, Morocco, Germany, the Caribbean, and Ivory Coast.

Miss Universe 2016

As Miss France, Mittenaere later competed in Miss Universe 2016. She was the only European delegate to progress to the semi-finals of the competition, later going on to win the title. Mittenaere became only the second woman from her country to win the crown after Christiane Martel won Miss Universe 1953. Mittenaere was additionally the first European winner since Oxana Fedorova of Russia, who was crowned Miss Universe 2002 but soon after dethroned, and the first European titleholder to complete her year as Miss Universe since Mona Grudt of Norway, who won Miss Universe 1990.

In the first part of the question and answer portion, Mittenaere called for open borders. She was asked the following by host Steve Harvey: "Given today's worldwide refugee crisis, do countries have an obligation to accept refugees or do they have a right to close their borders?" Mittenaere replied:

According to one of the judges, Mickey Boardman, who wrote about his experience as a Miss Universe judge in The New York Times, "it was the question-and-answer portion that put her over the top. While the other contestants didn’t seem to actually answer the question about a mistake they had made in life and what they had learned from it, she was poised and well spoken". The top three contestants were asked the same final question by Harvey: "Name something over the course of your life that you failed at, and tell us what you learned from that experience ?" and she replied:

Reign
Mittenaere was crowned with the DIC Crown at the Miss Universe 2016 contest. As a result of a lawsuit between IMG and Diamonds International Corporation (DIC), she wore the Diamond Nexus Crown from March 2017 until the end of her reign.

In her capacity as Miss Universe, she served as a judge at Puteri Indonesia in Jakarta, at Miss Egypt in Cairo at Miss Peru in Lima, at Miss Guyana held in New York City, and at Miss Diva in Mumbai. 

As a global ambassador, Mittenaere attended diplomatic events at the Embassy of France in Cairo, the Embassy of France in Manila, the Embassy of the United States, Manila, the Consulate general of France in New York, the Consulate general of France in Alexandria, and was invited to Emmanuel Macron's speech to the French expatriate community at the Kaufmann Concert Hall of 92Y in New York City. She traveled to Bali to shoot a commercial for C 1000, a vitamin brand available in Indonesia and attended Farouk Systems's Global Conference in Cancun.

As a charity ambassador for Smile Train, she traveled to Mexico City and Cap-Haïtien to visit cleft lip and cleft palate patients and witnessed a cleft surgery first-hand. As the newest madrina of the Latino Commission on AIDS, she attended the annual fundraising Cielo Gala to benefit the commission and was also invited to Project Sunshine's 14th Annual Benefit Celebration Brighter Together in New York City.

At New York Fashion Week, she walked the runway for Sherri Hill in February and September 2017. In June 2017, she attended Joyrich x Snoop Dogg's Fashion show at MADE LA 2017 in Los Angeles and was invited to the AmfAR generationCURE Solstice 2017 in New York City.

In March 2017, during her week-long homecoming celebration in Paris and in her hometown of Lille, Mittenaere was invited by François Hollande, the president of France, to visit Élysée Palace and was given a regional award by Xavier Bertrand, the president of Hauts-de-France. Mittenaere also walked for Jean Paul Gaultier at Paris Fashion Week, attended the Palais des Festivals at the 2017 Cannes Film Festival and attended the AmFAR Charity Event, Cinema Against AIDS, in Cannes.

During her reign as Miss Universe, Mittenaere traveled to the Philippines, Indonesia, Haiti, the Cayman Islands, Ecuador, Mexico, Peru, India, and Egypt, in addition to numerous trips around the United States and France.

For her last walk as the reigning Miss Universe, Mittenaere wore a Michael Cinco scarlet red ombré Couture gown, in full Swarovski crystals, which featured a fitted bodice and flowing train, before passing on the crown to her successor Demi-Leigh Nel-Peters of South Africa as Miss Universe 2017 on 26 November 2017 at Planet Hollywood Las Vegas in Las Vegas, Nevada.

From 4 to 9 December 2017, she participated to the Miss Universe's Christmas Tour in the Philippines, alongside her successor Demi-Leigh Nel-Peters and predecessor Pia Wurtzbach, then served as co-president of the jury with Jean-Paul Gaultier at Miss France 2018, appearing on stage with the five finalists as a part of the fashion swimsuit portion of the competition and putting an end to her international pageant career.

In December 2017, a documentary film about her Miss Universe reign, produced by Endemol Shine Group and titled From Miss France to Miss Universe, the fabulous destiny of Iris, was broadcast on TF1 and watched by 5.4 million viewers in France. The camera crew followed Mittenaere's reign as Miss Universe, her humanitarian travel, her trips and homecoming in France, and her family's reaction to her new life.

Post-Miss Universe
Iris Mittenaere began her television career in 2018, becoming a co-host of the French version of Ninja Warrior. In February 2018, Iris Mittenaere presented an award at the 2018 Victoires de la Musique, wearing designer Stéphane Rolland. In September 2018, Mittenaere began competing in the ninth season of Danse avec les stars, the French version of Dancing with the Stars. Her professional partner on the show was Anthony Colette, and together they placed second in the season's finale on December 1, 2018. From February 2019, she is the host of the Lottery Drawings and EuroMillions on TF1.

In March 2018, she was invited by the First Lady of Ivory Coast to attend the 7th Gala dinner of the Children of Africa Foundation, marking its 20th anniversary and the opening of a new hospital. She also participated to a Smile Train event, visiting families of cleft patients in Abidjan, Ivory Coast. Iris Mittenaere partnered with French Artist Philippe Shangti to create a photographic artwork titled "I'm Iris, I'm not a princess", sold 40,000 euros in June 2018 at an Auction for proceeds to Smile Train.

On 7 November 2018, Iris Mittenaere released her first autobiography titled in French Toujours y croire : Miss Univers, une jeune femme (pas) comme les autres which means Always believe in yourself: Miss Universe, a young woman (un)like any other. The book was published by HarperCollins. The book chronicles Mittenaere's origins in Northern France and her pageantry experience, in addition to beauty tutorials and advice for young women in order to build self-confidence. The same day, Mittenaere's Toujours y croire book tour launched, kicking off in her hometown of Lille. Other cities include Paris, Lyon, Toulouse, Bordeaux, Cannes, Dunkirk, Reims, Nantes in France, Brussels in Belgium and Geneva in Switzerland.

On February 3, 2019, Iris Mittenaere was on the judging panel of Top Model Belgium 2019 at Le Lido. From February 12 to 17, 2019, she was the guest star in Jean-Paul Gaultier's Fashion Freak Show at the Folies Bergère. She is Morgan's brand ambassador for 2019. On April 20, 2019, she was the face of Casa Fashion shows 14th edition, "The future is female", in Casablanca, Morocco. From May 2019 to January 2020, she is a vedette  in choreographer Kamel Ouali's L' Oiseau Paradis new revue at the Paradis Latin. On May 22, 2019, Iris Mittenaere climbed the steps of the Palais des Festivals at the 2019 Cannes Film Festival in a couture light pink crystallized ballgown designed by Michael Cinco. She also attended de Grisogono Host Gala Dinner, wearing a bejewelled blue one-shoulder gown, designed by Lebanese Ziad Nakad, which was adorned in gems and sequins.

In Forbes France’s Summer 2019 issue, Iris Mittenaere was interviewed and placed in France's top 5 of digital influencers on the 2019 list.

On June, 2022, Mittenaere was guest judge on the first episode of Drag Race France titled "Bonjour, Bonjour, Bonjour!" together with the French fashion designer Jean Paul Gaultier.

Personal life
In August 2022, Mittenaere announced her engagement to French businessman Diego El Glaoui, with whom she had been in a relationship for three years.

References

External links

Iris Mittenaere on Miss Universe Official Website 

1993 births
French beauty pageant winners
French female models
French people of Flemish descent
French television presenters
Miss France winners
Miss Universe 2016 contestants
Miss Universe winners
Living people
People from Lille
University of Lille Nord de France alumni
French women television presenters